Jørgen Buhl Rasmussen (born 18 August 1955) is the Danish Chief Executive of the Danish multi-national brewing company Carlsberg Group (Carlsberg A/S), based in Copenhagen (native København) in Denmark. Carlsberg is the name of a district of Copenhagen. The main shareholder of Carlsberg is the Carlsberg Foundation.

Early life
He has a BBA and an MBA from Copenhagen Business School.

Career
He started his career at IFH Research International in Denmark, owned by the Anglo-Dutch Unilever, now owned by WPP since 1989.

Carlsberg
He joined the executive board of Carlsberg Group on 1 April 2006. He became Chief Executive on 1 October 2007.

Personal life
He appears in Kraks Blå Bog, where he is listed as a koncernchef.

References

External links
 Carlsberg Group

1955 births
Danish brewers
Carlsberg Group
Copenhagen Business School alumni
Danish chief executives
Living people